SC Freiburg is a German women's association football team based in Freiburg. The team currently play in the top-flight Frauen-Bundesliga.

Players

Current squad

Former players

Club Staff

References

External links

Women's football clubs in Germany
Football clubs in Baden-Württemberg
Women
1975 establishments in West Germany
Association football clubs established in 1975
Frauen-Bundesliga clubs